Hettinger Township is a township in Adams County, North Dakota, United States. As of the 2010 census, its population was 195.

Hettinger, the county seat and the largest city in Adams County, is in Hettinger Township.

References

Townships in Adams County, North Dakota
Townships in North Dakota